The Netherlands women's national water polo team is the national team of the Kingdom of the Netherlands. It was one of the leading teams in the world during the 1980s and 1990s. More recently they claimed the gold medal at the 2008 Beijing Olympics. The team is governed by the Koninklijke Nederlandse Zwembond (KNZB).

Results

Medal count

Olympic Games

World Championship

World Cup

World League

 2010 – 7th place
 2015 – 3rd place
 2017 – 5th place
 2018 – 2nd place
 2019 – 4th place
 2022 – 4th place

European Championship

LEN Europa Cup

Holiday Cup

 1999 – 5th place
 2000 – 4th place
 2003 – 5th place
 2006 – 5th place
 2007 – 2nd place

World Games
 1981 – 1st place

Team

Current squad
Roster for the 2020 Summer Olympics.

Past squads

 1980 FINA World Cup –  Gold Medal
Hermine Perik (goal), Rita Heemskerk, Brigitte Hulscher, Ria Roos, Ingrid Scholten, Elly Spijker, Ann van Beek, Lieneke van den Heuvel, Greet van den Veen, Marga van Feggelen, and Marijke Zwart.

 1983 FINA World Cup –  Gold Medal
Hermine Perik (goal), Marion van der Mark (goal), Anita Bibo, J Boer, H van Heemstra, Janet Heijnert, D Heijnert, K Sterkenburg, Ria Roos, Ingrid Scholten, Elly Spijker, Ann van Beek, and Greet van den Veen.

 1985 European Championship –  Gold Medal
Madeline van Heemstra (goal), Marion van der Mark (goal), Janet Heijnert, Ineke Pesman, Belinda Hibbel, Lieneke van den Heuvel, Anita Bibo, Alice Lindhout, Monique Kranenburg, Patricia Libregts, Lillian Ossendrijver, Hedda Verdam, and Marian Walthie. Head Coach: Peter van den Biggelaar.

 1986 World Championship –  Silver Medal
Madeline van Heemstra (goal), Hellen Boering (goal), Anita Bibo, Lieneke van den Heuvel, Marjo van der Mark, Janet Heijnert, Monique Kranenburg, Patricia Libregts, Alice Lindhout, Ineke Pesman, Janny Spijker, Greet van den Veen, and Hedda Verdam. Head Coach: Peter van den Biggelaar.

 1987 European Championship –  Gold Medal
Madeline van Heemstra (goal), Hellen Boering (goal), Irma Brander, Lieneke van den Heuvel, Anita Bibo, Lillian Ossendrijver, Greet van den Veen, Monique Kranenburg, Patricia Libregts, Esmeralda van den Water, Ilse Sindorf, Janny Spijker, Anita Nijenhuis, and Hedda Verdam. Head Coach: Peter van den Biggelaar.

 1988 FINA World Cup –  Gold Medal
Hermine Perik (goal), Hellen Boering (goal), Anita Bibo, Irma Brander, Monique Kranenburg, Patricia Libregts, Alice Lindhout, Anita Nijenhuis, Lillian Ossendrijver, Janny Spijker, Lieneke van den Heuvel, Greet van den Veen, and Hedda Verdam. Head Coach: Peter van den Biggelaar.

 1989 European Championship –  Gold Medal
Hermine Perik (goal), Hellen Boering (goal), Irma Brander, Lieneke van den Heuvel, Monique Kranenburg, Alice Lindhout, Astrid van den Meer, Anita Nijenhuis, Ilse Sindorf, Janny Spijker, Greet van den Veen, Esmeralda van den Water, Patricia Libregts, and Hedda Verdam. Head Coach: Peter van den Biggelaar.

 1989 FINA World Cup –  Gold Medal
Hermine Perik (goal), Hellen Boering (goal), Irma Brander, Lieneke van den Heuvel, Monique Kranenburg, Alice Lindhout, Patricia Libregts, Anita Nijenhuis, Ilse Sindorf, Janny Spijker, Astrid van der Meer, Greet van den Veen, Hedda Verdam, and Esmeralda van den Water. Head Coach: Peter van den Biggelaar.

 1991 World Championship –  Gold Medal
Karla van der Boon (goal), Hellen Boering (goal), Irma Brander, Edmée Hiemstra, Monique Kranenburg, Karin Kuipers, Patricia Libregts, Alice Lindhout, Lillian Ossendrijver, Janny Spijker, Esmeralda van den Water, Marjan op den Velde, and Hedda Verdam. Head Coach: Peter van den Biggelaar.

 1991 European Championship –  Silver Medal
Karla van der Boon (goal), Hellen Boering (goal), Edmée Hiemstra, Janny Spijker, Monique Kranenburg, Angelique Beijaard, Alice Lindhout, Karin Kuipers, Esmeralda van den Water, Patricia Libregts, Rianne Schram, Marjan op den Velde, Sandra Scherrenburg, and Hedda Verdam. Head Coach: Kees van Hardeveld.

 1991 FINA World Cup –  Gold Medal
Karla van der Boon (goal), Hellen Boering (goal), Angelique Beijaard, Edmée Hiemstra, Monique Kranenburg, Karin Kuipers, Patricia Libregts, Alice Lindhout, Marjan op den Velde, Lillian Ossendrijver, Rianne Schram, Janny Spijker, Esmeralda van den Water, and Hedda Verdam. Head Coach: Kees van Hardeveld.

 1993 European Championship –  Gold Medal
Karla van der Boon (goal), Hellen Boering (goal), Ellen Bast, Gillian van den Berg, Edmée Hiemstra, Karin Kuipers, Ingrid Leijendekker, Alice Lindhout, Carla Quint, Sandra Scherrenburg, Rianne Schram, Janny Spijker, and Hedda Verdam. Head Coach: Kees van Hardeveld.

 1993 FINA World Cup –  Gold Medal
Karla van der Boon (goal), Hellen Boering (goal), Ellen Bast, Gillian van den Berg, Edmée Hiemstra, Karin Kuipers, Ingrid Leijendekker, Alice Lindhout, Sandra Scherrenburg, Carla Quint, Rianne Schram, Janny Spijker, and Hedda Verdam. Head Coach: Kees van Hardeveld.

 1994 World Championship –  Silver Medal
Karla van der Boon (goal), Hellen Boering (goal), Ellen Bast, Gillian van den Berg, Edmée Hiemstra, Stella Kriekaard, Karin Kuipers, Ingrid Leijendekker, Alice Lindhout, Sandra Scherrenburg, Rianne Schram, Janny Spijker, and Hedda Verdam. Head Coach: Kees van Hardeveld.

 1995 European Championship –  Bronze Medal
Karla van der Boon (goal), Karin Bouwens (goal), Ellen Bast, Gillian van den Berg, Suzanne van der Boomen, Edmée Hiemstra, Karin Kuipers, Ingrid Leijendekker, Sandra Scherrenburg, Carla Quint, Rianne Schram, Marjan op den Velde, and Hedda Verdam. Head Coach: Kees van Hardeveld.

 1996 Olympic Year Tournament –  Gold Medal
Karla van der Boon (goal), Ellen Bast, Gillian van den Berg, Edmée Hiemstra, Erica Hoskens, Leontine Koops, Karin Kuipers, Ingrid Leijendekker, Petra Meerdink, Marjan op den Velde, Mirjam Overdam, Carla Quint, and Mariëlle Schothans. Head Coach: Kees van Hardeveld.

 1997 FINA World Cup –  Gold Medal
Karla van der Boon (goal), Carla van Usen (goal), Ellen Bast, Gillian van den Berg, Edmée Hiemstra, Karin Kuipers, Ingrid Leijendekker, Sandra Scherrenburg, Marjan op den Velde, Mirjam Overdam, Carla Quint, Mariëlle Schothans, and Suzanne van den Boomen. Head Coach: Kees van Hardeveld.

 1997 European Championship –  Bronze Medal
Karla van der Boon (goal), Carla van Usen (goal), Edmée Hiemstra, Ingrid Leijendekker, Marjan op den Velde, Ellen Bast, Daniëlle de Bruijn, Petra Meerdink, Gillian van den Berg, Mirjam Overdam, Karin Kuipers, Mariëlle Schothans, Sandra Scherrenburg, and Carla Quint. Head Coach: Kees van Hardeveld.

 1998 World Championship –  Silver Medal
Karla van der Boon (goal), Carla van Usen (goal), Ellen Bast, Gillian van den Berg, Daniëlle de Bruijn, Edmée Hiemstra, Karin Kuipers, Ingrid Leijendekker, Petra Meerdink, Carla Quint, Sandra Scherrenburg, Mariëlle Schothans, and Marjan op den Velde. Head Coach: Kees van Hardeveld.

 1999 FINA World Cup –  Gold Medal
Karla van der Boon (goal), Hellen Boering (goal), Ellen Bast, Gillian van den Berg, Daniëlle de Bruijn, Edmée Hiemstra, Mariëtte Koehorst, Karin Kuipers, Ingrid Leijendekker, Patricia Libregts, Marjan op den Velde, Mirjam Overdam, and Carla Quint. Head Coach: Kees van Hardeveld.

 1999 European Championship –  Silver Medal
Karla van der Boon (goal), Hellen Boering (goal), Ellen Bast, Gillian van den Berg, Daniëlle de Bruijn, Edmée Hiemstra, Karin Kuipers, Ingrid Leijendekker, Patricia Libregts, Jorieke Oostendorp, Marjan op den Velde, Mirjam Overdam, and Carla Quint. Head Coach: Jan Mensink.

Under-20 team
The Netherlands lastly competed at the 2021 FINA Junior Water Polo World Championships.

See also
 Netherlands women's Olympic water polo team records and statistics
 Netherlands men's national water polo team
 List of Olympic champions in women's water polo
 List of women's Olympic water polo tournament records and statistics
 List of world champions in women's water polo

References

External links

Press Info issued by the Dutch Swimming Federation

Women's national water polo teams
Women's water polo in the Netherlands